The following is the list of teams to overcome 3–0 series deficits, otherwise known as a reverse sweep. The listed teams won four consecutive games after being down three games to none in a best-of-seven playoff series.

Background

Three major North American professional sports leagues have playoff series that can reach a seventh game: Major League Baseball (MLB), the National Basketball Association (NBA), and the National Hockey League (NHL).

In the history of these leagues, teams that were down 3–0 in a series have come back to win the series five times; four times in the NHL and once in MLB. The most recent example is the Los Angeles Kings of the NHL in the 2014 Stanley Cup playoffs. The only instance in a championship finals series was by the NHL's Toronto Maple Leafs in the 1942 Stanley Cup Finals.

Conversely, teams have had their 3–0 comeback fall short after evening a series nine times: five in the NHL, three in the NBA, and one in MLB. The most recent example is the Houston Astros of MLB in the 2020 American League Championship Series.

No team has overcome multiple 3–0 deficits in a single postseason, although the 1974–75 New York Islanders of the NHL nearly did so; they successfully overcame a 3–0 series deficit in the 1975 quarterfinals, then rallied from a 3–0 series deficit in the semifinals before losing the seventh game.

While seven-game series were traditionally used only for the final series of a postseason, MLB adopted a best-of-seven format for its semi-finals (the League Championship Series) in 1985, the NHL followed suit for its first round in 1987, and the NBA did the same for its first round in 2003.

Outside of the noted major North American leagues, various other leagues across multiples sports also use seven-game postseason series. There are several known instances of teams in such leagues overcoming 3–0 series deficits. In other cases like the Swedish Hockey League, seven-game series are common but no team has yet overcome such a deficit.

List of teams

Key

National Hockey League

Successful comebacks
Four NHL teams have overcome 3–0 deficits, only one of which occurred in the Stanley Cup Finals. Three comebacks were completed with game 7 on road ice, while one was completed on home ice.

Unsuccessful comebacks
Five other NHL teams have evened a series after being down 3–0, only to lose game 7. Four of these teams were the visiting team in game 7, while the Detroit Red Wings were the only home team in game 7.

Major League Baseball

Successful comebacks
One MLB team has overcome a 3–0 deficit to win the series.

Unsuccessful comebacks
One MLB team has evened a series after being down 0–3, but lost game 7.

National Basketball Association

Unsuccessful comebacks
Three NBA teams have evened a series after being down 0–3, only to lose in game 7. All three teams were the visiting team in game 7. To date, there has never been a successful comeback from a 3-0 series deficit in the NBA.

Other leagues
Outside of MLB, the NBA, and the NHL, there are some other known instances of successful comebacks from 3–0 series deficits. The Slovak ice hockey club HK Dukla Trenčín and the Swiss ice hockey club EV Zug are the only teams that managed to overcome 3–0 deficit twice.

Successful comebacks

Unsuccessful comebacks

3–0 Comebacks in a best-of-seven with ties
While ties can prolong the series to eight games or more, these are still best-of-seven series in that only seven of the games can have a decisive winner. Four victories still takes the series, thus overcoming a 3–0 deficit is still equally difficult.

See also
 List of teams to overcome 3–1 series deficits

References

Major League Baseball postseason
National Basketball Association playoffs
Stanley Cup playoffs
Sports accomplishments